Johanna Hurwitz (born October 9, 1937) is an American author of more than sixty children's books. She has sold millions of books in many different languages.

Life and career
Hurwitz graduated from Queens College, New York with a degree in English and Columbia University with a master's in library science.

After many years working as a librarian, Hurwitz wrote her first book, Busybody Nora, in 1976, one of the first in the chapter book genre for transitioning young readers from shorter stories to novels. Busybody Nora took 17 tries for publishing companies to publish the book. Ravenstone Press published the book three months after Hurwitz submitted the story.

Hurwitz's books include biographies for children on subjects such as Anne Frank, Astrid Lindgren, Leonard Bernstein, and Helen Keller.  Her 1999 book, The Just Desserts Club, combined related short stories with recipes.

Hurwitz is the aunt of Garance Franke-Ruta and Ted Frank.

Selected works

Fiction
Busybody Nora,  (William Morrow, 1976)
Baseball Fever, illustrated by Ray Cruz (William Morrow, 1981)
Class President, illustrated by Sheila Hamanaka (William Morrow, 1990)
New Shoes for Silvia, illustrated by Jerry Pinkney (William Morrow, 1993)

References

External links
 
 

1937 births
Living people
American children's writers
Columbia University School of Library Service alumni
Queens College, City University of New York alumni
Place of birth missing (living people)
American women children's writers
20th-century American novelists
20th-century American women writers
20th-century American biographers
American women novelists
American women biographers
21st-century American women